Tetratheca rubioides is a species of flowering plant in the quandong family that is endemic to Australia.

Description
The species grows as a compact shrub to 30–60 cm in height. The linear leaves are 3–15 mm long and 1 mm wide. The flowers are deep lilac-pink, with petals 5–11 mm long, appearing mostly from October to November.

Distribution and habitat
The range of the species extends from the Blue Mountains to the Braidwood district in eastern New South Wales, where the plants grow in heath and sclerophyll forest on sandstone.

References

rubioides
Flora of New South Wales
Oxalidales of Australia
Taxa named by Allan Cunningham (botanist)
Plants described in 1825